The Church of Our Lady of the Assumption and St Gregory is a Catholic church on Warwick Street, Westminster.  It was formerly known as the Royal Bavarian Chapel, because like several Catholic churches in London it originated as a chapel within a foreign embassy.  It was built between 1789 and 1790 to the designs of Joseph Bonomi the Elder. The only surviving eighteenth-century Catholic chapel in London, it is a Grade II* listed building. The parish is now operated by the Personal Ordinariate of Our Lady of Walsingham, the British personal ordinariate for the Anglican Use within the Catholic Church.

History

The origins of the church lie in the chapel established in the 1730s at the Portuguese Embassy on 24 Golden Square.  At this time, with the English Penal Laws in force, most Roman Catholic chapels existed under the protection, and within the precincts, of foreign embassies. Responsibility for the chapel passed to the Bavarian embassy in 1747 but it was destroyed in the Gordon Riots in 1780.  The replacement church was designed by Joseph Bonomi the Elder, an Italian architect and draughtsman, who had moved to London in 1767 to work in the practice of Robert and James Adam. Prayers continued to be said for the King of Bavaria, and the church described as the Royal Bavarian Chapel, until 1871.

The church has attracted many prominent Catholic worshippers, including Mrs Fitzherbert, who was sacramentally, but not civilly married to George IV, and the young Cardinal Newman. The Irish politician Daniel O'Connell attended regularly when in London. The Victorian explorer and translator of the Kama Sutra Sir Richard Burton married in the church and the novelist Evelyn Waugh had his second wedding here in 1937. In 1983, the funeral Mass for Ralph Richardson, a regular worshipper, was held at the church.

Present day
In the early 21st century, the church was the home of "one of the most successful LGBT Catholic parishes in the world". For six years, these "Soho masses" offered twice-monthly services “particularly welcoming to lesbian, gay, bisexual and transgendered Catholics, their parents, friends and families”. In 2013, under pressure from the Vatican, they were forced to move to the Church of the Immaculate Conception, Farm Street in nearby Mayfair; Archbishop Vincent Nichols attended their first Mass there in 2013. In the same year the church was entrusted to the Personal Ordinariate of Our Lady of Walsingham.

Exterior
The exterior is of plain brick, stained red in 1952. The brick facade was deliberately "unassuming", in response to the destruction of the earlier chapel, and the gilded stars and angels which now decorate the facade date from the 1950s. It is of three bays and two storeys.

Interior

The interior retains some of its Georgian decoration, but the church was restored and altered in the Victorian period, firstly in renovations carried out by John Erlam, in 1853, which also saw the installation, over the altar, of the bas-relief of the Assumption, by John Edward Carew. A second period of restoration took place from 1874, under the direction of John Francis Bentley, the architect of Westminster Cathedral.

See also

 Embassy chapel
 St Etheldreda's Church
 Sardinian Embassy Chapel
 St James's, Spanish Place

Notes

References

External links
British Listed Buildings Online website
RC Church of our Lady of the Assumption and St Gregory website
British History Online website

Our Lady
Churches in the Roman Catholic Diocese of Westminster
Grade II* listed Roman Catholic churches in England
Grade II* listed churches in the City of Westminster
18th-century Roman Catholic church buildings in the United Kingdom
Roman Catholic churches completed in 1790
1790 establishments in England
Embassy chapels
Personal ordinariates